The women's 400 metres hurdles event at the 2006 Commonwealth Games was held on March 22–23.

Medalists

Results

Heats
Qualification: First 3 of each heat (Q) and the next 2 fastest (q) qualified for the final.

Final

References
Results

400
2006
2006 in women's athletics